Click identifier may refer to several online user tracking mechanisms:

 DoubleClick Click Identifier (dclid), used by DoubleClick, now Google
 Facebook Click Identifier (fbclid) used by Facebook in social media analytics
 Google Click Identifier (gclid, gclsrc, wbraid and gbraid), used by Google Ads
 Microsoft Click Identifier (msclkid), used by Bing Ads

See also
 Query string
 UTM parameters
 Web analytics
 Social media analytics